The Temple of Janus at the Forum Holitorium is the second known temple dedicated to Janus, besides the temple of the same name located in the Roman Forum.
It is known that it stood "close to the Theatre of Marcellus" (ad theatrum Marcelli or iuxta theatrum Marcelli) and "outside Porta Carmentalis" (extra portam Carmentalem) and that feasts took place there in August and October. 

It is highly likely that it is one of the three contiguous temples from the Republican era in the area of the ancient Forum Holitorium – where now stands the church of S. Nicola in Carcere – and more specifically the northernmost one, to the right than the facade of the church.
The remains of the temple are seven columns in tuff - a material typical of the original age of construction and of the Roman tradition - incorporated with their architrave in the right side of the church and two columns rising on the basement just near the Theatre of Marcellus.

History 
The temple was built by Gaius Duilius in 3rd century BC, at the time of the First Punic War, after the Roman victory at the battle of Mylae.

Augustus began a restoration of the temple, a project completed by his heir Tiberius in 17 AD. According to Pliny the Elder, Augustus brought a statue of Janus, a work either of Scopas or Praxiteles, to be dedicated in this temple.

Description 

The temple had a Ionic hexastyle pronaos and featured another row of six columns behind the facade and one of nine on the long side; it was nonetheless devoid of posticum, i.e. the rear colonnade, since the peristasis of columns did not cover that side.
The temple was entirely covered with peperino, like the one used for the Temple of Hadrian, and rested on a basement of concrete covered with travertine. The columns and capitals were made of marble as well, unlike the nearby Temple of Portunus which had a stucco covering.

See also
 List of Ancient Roman temples

Notes

Bibliography

External links 
 

Lacus Curtius - Platner

Janus
3rd-century BC religious buildings and structures